Galvarino Sergio Apablaza Guerra (born November 9, 1950), nicknamed "Comandante Salvador", is a Chilean Marxist guerrilla and former member of the Manuel Rodríguez Patriotic Front (FPMR) , which opposed the military dictatorship of Augusto Pinochet. He has participated in several highly publicized kidnappings and murders.

Background
Son of Galvarino Apablaza Orrego and Luisa Guerra Urrutia. He was the leader of the Marxist-Leninist group FPMR, founded in 1983 as the armed wing of the Communist Party of Chile (PCCh).   Its mission was to carry out guerrilla attacks against the Chilean military dictatorship of Augusto Pinochet. It is named after Manuel Rodriguez, considered a hero in the war of the independence of Chile against Spain.

After the fall of Pinochet's regime and the return to democracy in 1989, the organization broke up into two factions: the FPMR Party, which gave up the armed fight, and the FPMR-Autonomous, which continued armed activities. Some of the FPMR most recent attacks include the explosion of a building in which the American company Flour Daniel has offices (August 1994),  an attempted bombing of a Kentucky Fried Chicken restaurant in Santiago (September 1993), an explosion near the Chinese Embassy in Santiago (May 1993), and a bombing of a meetinghouse of the LDS Church in Santiago (December 1992).

Apablaza participated in the kidnapping of the Brazilian advertising executive Washington Olivetto in 2001, according to Brazilian police authorities.

Charges

He has been charged by the Chilean judge Hugo Dolmestch for the following crimes: the kidnapping of Cristian Edwards (son of Agustín Edwards Eastman, owner of the newspaper El Mercurio) and the assassination of Senator Jaime Guzmán.

Galvarino Apablaza was arrested on November 29, 2004 in Argentina. Chilean authorities requested his expulsion so he could be tried in Chile. He immediately asked for political asylum with the support of several human rights organizations, but his situation is still unclear. The Argentine supreme court originally approved his extradition to Chile during September 2010.1

On September 30, 2010 the government of Argentina granted Apablaza political asylum following a meeting of Conare, the National Commission for Refugees.
Apablaza is married to Paula Chain, who happens to be a member of President Cristina Kirchner press relations office at Government House (Casa Rosada) and usually accompanies the Argentine president whenever she travels overseas, the most recent trip was to Germany.

Exile in Argentina 
Apablaza was accused of being the intellectual author of the murder of Jaime Guzmán and the kidnapping of Cristián Edwards. At the request of the Chilean Justice, an Interpol arrest warrant was issued against him in June 2004.

No concrete news of him had been heard until November 29, 2004, when in a special operation by the Argentine police, he was arrested in the town of Moreno, of Buenos Aires province, where he lived under the false name of "Héctor Daniel Mondaca" for several years with his partner, the Chilean journalist Paula Chahín, who was employed in the Secretariat of Media of the Presidency, and his three sons of Argentine nationality.

References

1950 births
Living people
People from Santiago
Communist Party of Chile politicians
Chilean revolutionaries
Chilean Marxists
Manuel Rodríguez Patriotic Front